Middle Island is an island in King Sound in the Kimberley region of Western Australia.

References

Islands of the Kimberley (Western Australia)